Mount Cornwell is located on the Continental Divide on the boundary between British Columbia and Alberta along the spine of the Park Ranges of  the Canadian Rockies. The mountain was named in 1918 after "boy hero" John Cornwell, a sixteen-year-old crewman aboard HMS Chester, which was severely damaged in the Battle of Jutland. Cornwell was posthumously awarded the Victoria Cross for his bravery during the battle. Mount Chester was also named after his ship.

See also
List of peaks on the Alberta–British Columbia border

References

Two-thousanders of Alberta
Two-thousanders of British Columbia
Canadian Rockies
Great Divide of North America
Borders of Alberta
Borders of British Columbia